, known professionally as OKI, is a Japanese musician of Ainu ancestry. He was born in Hokkaido, and grew up in Kanagawa Prefecture. He studied industrial arts at the Tokyo National University of Fine Arts and Music. His father, Bikki Sunazawa, was a renowned wood sculptor. Oki uses the tonkori, an Ainu stringed instrument, in his performances and mixes traditional Ainu music with reggae, dub and other styles of world music.  He also plays guitar and traditional Ainu percussion instruments.

Oki performs frequently in Japan, and he has also taken part in a number of folk music festivals in other countries.  In 2006, he released the album Kíla & Oki with the Irish band, Kíla.  His earlier solo albums include collaborations with the female Ainu singing group Marewrew, who sometimes appear in his live show as well.  More recently, he has played with his own Oki Dub Ainu Band, which plays mostly traditional Ainu songs in an electric style which mixes dub rhythms with tonkori playing.  During live concerts, he either plays with the Dub Ainu Band or as a solo acoustic act, singing and playing the tonkori. He also plays tonkori in the collaborative group Amamiaynu.

Works 

Albums, singles
Hankapuy (feat. Umeko Ando)　March 20, 1999
Kamuy Kor Nupurpe May 27, 2001
No-One'S Land　June 2, 2002
Dub Ainu　October 17, 2004
Tonkori　May 12, 2005
"Tóg É Go Bog É" (Single)　February 17, 2006 (Kíla and OKI)
"Kíla & Oki"(album), 2006 (Kíla and OKI)
, Greatest hits　- February 17, 2006
Dub Ainu Deluxe　July 16, 2006
Oki Dub Ainu Band December 3, 2006
"Eternal Dub Serenade" May 30, 2007
Sakhalin Rock July 14, 2010
Himalayan Dub April 16, 2011
Tonkori in the Moonlight February 4, 2022
Collaborations
IHUNKE　- Umeko Ando　- May 20, 2001
UPOPO SANKE　- Umeko Ando　- December 14, 2003
 - OKI meets Misako Oshiro - March 14, 2012

Picture book

Story - ,　Illustrations - OKI

Television
Opening narration for K-tai Investigator 7

See also
Ainu music

References

External links 
Official website 
Description at Farside Music
OKI Profile on La Fábrica de Ideas 
OKI at HearJapan(403 Forbidden link)

1957 births
Ainu music
Japanese Ainu people
Japanese male musicians
Living people
Musicians from Hokkaido
Musicians from Kanagawa Prefecture
Ainu artists
Japanese folk singers